The Butler Bulldogs softball team represents Butler University in NCAA Division I college softball. The team was founded during the 1980–1981 academic school year, and is a member of the Big East Conference (Big East). The Bulldogs play their home games at the Butler Softball Field on campus in Indianapolis, IN.

During their tenure in the Big East Conference, the Bulldogs have claimed 1 Big East Conference softball tournament title.

History
The Bulldogs first fielded a varsity softball team in 1981 and have been a member of five (5) athletic conferences during their existence which includes the North Star Conference, Midwestern Collegiate Athletic Conference (MCC), Horizon League, Atlantic 10 and, as of 2014, the Big East Conference.The Butler softball team has been led by Scott Hall for the last 12 seasons and is the 8th head coach in program history. Hall led the Bulldogs to a team record 4 tournament game wins in 2011 as well as a team record 16 conference wins in a single season in 2022. Hall also guided the Bulldogs to their first ever NCAA Tournament appearance in 2016 after capturing the programs first conference tournament championship.

Butler Softball Field 
The Butler softball team calls the Butler Softball Field home, located adjacent to the Holcomb Gardens across the Inland Waterway Canal. The field is a part of a larger athletic field complex that features Varsity Field (the alternate field for both the men's and women's soccer teams), the outdoor tennis courts and intramural softball and soccer fields.

The facility underwent major renovations during the summer and fall of 2010. A new press box was built along with new bleachers and walkways. Also, the actual playing field was replaced and is now one of the best surfaces in the region. In 2010, the facility received a new infield surface with a natural sand and clay mix.

The field features brick dugouts for both the home and visiting benches, a bullpen area and batting cages located down the first base line out of play and spectator seating for up to 500 people. The field's outfield dimensions extend to 200 feet from foul pole to foul pole.

Head coaching history

Conference affiliation
On March 20, 2013, the Butler administration announced that the school would join the reconfigured Big East, and moved to the new conference on July 1, 2013.